Charlie Gallagher may refer to:

 Charlie Gallagher (Scottish footballer) (1940–2021), football player for the Republic of Ireland
 Charlie Gallagher (Gaelic footballer) (1937–1989), Gaelic football player

See also
Charles Gallagher (disambiguation)